Wedge is the surname of:

 Albert Clark Wedge (1834-1911), American physician and politician
 Cathy Wedge (born 1950), Canadian equestrian
 Charles Wedge (1810–1895), Australian explorer
 Charles Wedge of Shudy Camps (1746–1842), English farmer and surveyor
 Chris Wedge (born 1957), American voice actor, producer and director
 Don Wedge (1929–2012), American football official
 Edward Davy Wedge (1777–1852), Tasmanian settler
 Edwin Wedge (1911–1994), American speed skater
 Eric Wedge (born 1968), American baseball manager
 Frederick Wedge (1880–1953), American boxer
 Harry Wedge (1958–2012), Australian Aboriginal artist
 James Wedge (born 1939), British fashion designer and photographer
 John Wedge (1744–1816), English agriculturalist
 John Helder Wedge (1793–1872), Tasmanian explorer and politician
 Stuart Wedge (born 1985), English cricketer
 Thomas Wedge (rugby union) (1881–1964), British rugby union player
 Thomas Wedge of Chester (1760–1854), English agriculturalist